Ocnerioxyna hemilea is a species of tephritid or fruit flies in the genus Ocnerioxyna of the family Tephritidae.

Distribution
Ethiopia.

References

Tephritinae
Insects described in 1939
Diptera of Africa